Sailosi Wai Kepa (4 November 1938 – 1 March 2004) was a Fijian statesman, judge, and diplomat.

Born in the village of Nukuni on the island of Ono-i-Lau, Kepa was one of many distinguished public figures to hail from the Lau archipelago. He was educated at Draiba Fijian School and Lelean Memorial School, before enrolling in Nasinu Teachers College in 1959. He went on to receive a Diploma in Teaching of English from the University of Sydney in 1966. In 1972, he received a Law degree from the renowned Middle Temple in London, England.

Kepa's legal career was a distinguished one, which took him into politics, diplomacy, and the judiciary. After joining the Department of Justice as a magistrate in 1969 (serving Suva, Sigatoka, Nadi, and the Northern Division), he became Chief Magistrate in 1980. He also became Director of Public Prosecutions in November that year. He went on to become Fiji's High Commissioner to London in 1985, and Minister for Justice and Attorney General in 1988. He served in this role until 1992, when he became a High Court judge. In 1998 he was appointed the first Chairman of Fiji's Human Rights Commission. His last official post was as Fiji's Ombudsman, a post he held from 2001 till his retirement in August 2003.

In his younger years, Kepa made a name for himself as a rugby player. He was later rewarded by being made Chairman of the Fiji Rugby Union from 1983 to 1986. He was granted life membership in 1994.

Kepa was married for many years to Ro Teimumu Kepa, an Adi (Fijian chief) and politician in her own right, who is  the Roko Tui Dreketi (Paramount Chief) of the Burebasaga Confederacy and served as Minister for Education from 2001 to 2006 in the government of Prime Minister Laisenia Qarase. Since 2014, she has been Leader of the Social Democratic Liberal Party, and since the general elections in September that year, Leader of the Opposition. They had three children: Sailosi Jr., Asenaca, and Tupoutu’a.

References

1938 births
2004 deaths
20th-century Fijian judges
Fijian civil servants
People educated at Lelean Memorial School
High Commissioners of Fiji to the United Kingdom
Ombudsmen in Fiji
Attorneys-general of Fiji
I-Taukei Fijian people
Politicians from Ono-i-Lau